The Treaty of Doak's Stand (7 Stat. 210, also known as Treaty with the Choctaw) was signed on October 18, 1820 (proclaimed on January 8, 1821) between the United States and the Choctaw Indian tribe. Based on the terms of the accord, the Choctaw agreed to give up approximately one-half of their remaining Choctaw homeland. In October 1820, Andrew Jackson and Thomas Hinds were sent as commissioners who represented the United States to negotiate a treaty to surrender a large portion of Choctaw country in Mississippi. They met with tribal representatives at Doak's Stand on the Natchez Trace. They met with the chiefs Pushmataha, Mushulatubbee, and Apuckshunubbee, who represented the three major regional divisions of the Choctaw. Chiefs of the towns and other prominent men accompanied them, such as Colonel Silas Dinsmoor.

Dinsmore was a former US Indian agent to the Choctaw; his passport ruling in 1812 had stirred a brief controversy with General Andrew Jackson. Dinsmore was at the negotiations to settle a land claim; he believed the policy of the American government toward the Indian tribes was too harsh. His attitude suggested a potential confrontation, but Jackson paid no attention to him.

The convention began on October 10 with a talk by Jackson (whom the Choctaw nicknamed Sharp Knife), to more than 500 Choctaw.  After Jackson presented his proposal to exchange Choctaw land for territory in present-day Arkansas, Pushmataha accused the general of deceiving them about the quality of land west of the Mississippi. Pushmataha said, "I know the country well ... The grass is everywhere very short ... There are but few beavers, and the honey and fruit are rare things." Jackson finally resorted to threats to pressure the Choctaw to sign a treaty. He shouted, "Many of your nation are already beyond the Mississippi, and others are every year removing .... If you refuse ... the nation will be destroyed." On October 18, 1820, the chiefs signed the treaty.

Article IV prepared the Choctaw to become citizens of the United States when he or she became acculturated. This article would later influence Article XIV in the 1830 Treaty of Dancing Rabbit Creek.

Terms

The preamble begins,

The terms of the treaty were:

1. Choctaw land (in Mississippi) ceded to the U.S.
2. Boundary of western land (in Arkansas) ceded to the Choctaw nation. 
3. Marking of boundaries by Choctaw-appointed guide.
4. Boundaries may not change until the Choctaw are civilized and enlightened so as to become citizens of the United States.
5. Corn, Blankets, kettles, rifle guns, bullet moulds & nippers, and ammunition to be given to Choctaws, who moved from ceded territory to lands west of the Mississippi River (Oklahoma), for one year.
6. U.S. agent appointed, goods and supplies to be sent, and a blacksmith will be appointed to Choctaws in ceded lands. Property of removed Choctaws to be sent to them.
7. Selling of Choctaw lands to support Choctaw schools on both sides of the Mississippi River.  
8. Annuity of $6000 US annually for 16 years for discontented Choctaws.

Choctaw Reservation 
The Reservation granted to the Choctaw in Arkansas was defined and land between the Red River in the South, and the Canadian and Arkansas Rivers in the North. In the West, the boundary ran from the Source of the Candian River. This was, at the time, in Mexico. The land actually owned by the United States began where the Canadian and Red Rivers crossed the 100th Meridian West, what is today the Oklahoma-Texas border. 

Along the Red River, the border ran East until it reached the point where the Little River enters the Red River, what is today Fulton, Arkansas. The border then ran Northeast to the Easternmost boundary of the Cherokee Reservation, established in 1817. That Reservation begain where Point Remove Creek entered the Arkansas River, what is today Morrilton, Arkansas. From there, it ran East along the Arkansas River, through Fort Smith, to the where the Canadian River enters the Arkansas. From there it followed the Canadian River to its source, or realistically the 100th Meridian.

Signatories

Andrew Jackson, Thomas Hinds, Apukshunnubbee, Pooshawattaha, and Mushulatubbee.

See also

List of Choctaw Treaties
Treaty of Hopewell
Treaty of Fort Adams
Treaty of Fort Confederation
Treaty of Hoe Buckintoopa
Treaty of Mount Dexter
Treaty of Fort St. Stephens
Treaty of Washington City
Treaty of Dancing Rabbit Creek
List of treaties

Citations

External links
Indian Affairs: Laws and Treaties (Treaty with the Choctaw, 1820)

Natchez Trace
Doak's Stand
1821 treaties